"So Sick" is a song by American singer-songwriter Ne-Yo, written alongside Norwegian production duo Stargate for Ne-Yo's debut studio album, In My Own Words (2006). Produced by Stargate, the song was released as the second single from the album on November 21, 2005, and received favorable reviews from music critics. "So Sick" peaked at number one on both the US Billboard Hot 100 and the UK Singles Chart. In Europe, the single topped the Eurochart Hot 100 and entered the top 20 in 10 countries, including Denmark, Hungary, Ireland, Norway, and Switzerland. In Australasia, the single reached number two in New Zealand and number four in Australia.

Background
Ne-Yo met Norwegian production team Stargate, consisting of Mikkel S. Eriksen and Tor Erik Hermansen, in a hallway at Sony Music Studios on West 54th Street, New York City after the duo had settled there in the early 2005. After finding out they produced R&B-oriented tracks, among others, they started on writing songs for his debut studio album In My Own Words (2006) for which they produced six songs, including "So Sick".

While Eriksen and Hermansen composed the music for the song, Ne-Yo penned the song's lyrics. "So Sick" centers on a character, who is tired of hearing love songs playing on the radio, as they remind him of his last relationship and breakup. Ne-Yo later confirmed that he got the idea for the song from a former girlfriend: "It's about the first time I fell in love with a girl in a way that I completely screwed it up. So it was a story that I didn't have to think really hard about putting it together. A lot of heartbreak went into that song, so that's why I think a lot of people dug it the way they did – because you can feel it."

Reception
"So Sick" received generally positive responses from contemporary music critics. Bill Lamb of About stated that the smooth instrumental of the song makes it stand out and appropriate to listen during the mid-winter season. He was pleased with Ne-Yo's vocals but noted that "more emotional involvement would have made his performance more memorable", calling them "restrained". A review from Contactmusic.com echoed the latter's comment, saying that his vocal rendition is "stunning", while complimenting the Stargate production, defining it as a "melodic masterpiece".

Music video

The music video for "So Sick" was directed by Hype Williams and filmed in Aspen, Colorado. Shot in the snow as well as inside a mansion, Ne-Yo commented on filming: "The house we rented out was ridiculous. The walls turned, and there were heated floors. It was crazy." It saw heavy rotation on music video networks BET and MTV.

Two music videos were shot for the song, the discarded version featured an urban imagery different to the winter-snow scenario of the original one.

Remixes

There are five "So Sick" remixes. The official remix was produced by Trackmasters and features rap vocals by LL Cool J and sampled Michael Jackson's song "Human Nature". This remix first appeared on LL Cool J's eleventh album, Todd Smith. One features Jin. Another remix features labelmate Jay-Z. There is also a remix with rapper Joe Budden. Another remix is sung by Patrick Stump from Fall Out Boy, who has also been known to cover the song.

Track listings

Charts

Weekly charts

Year-end charts

Certifications

Release history

Covers and samples
In 2020, Australian rapper The Kid Laroi released a reworking of the song called "Need You Most (So Sick)", from his debut mixtape, F*ck Love. The song was sampled by Pop Smoke for his 2021 song "Woo Baby" (featuring Chris Brown) contained in his second album Faith.

References

2005 songs
2006 singles
Billboard Hot 100 number-one singles
Def Jam Recordings singles
European Hot 100 Singles number-one singles
Music videos directed by Hype Williams
Ne-Yo songs
Song recordings produced by Stargate (record producers)
Songs written by Mikkel Storleer Eriksen
Songs written by Ne-Yo
Songs written by Tor Erik Hermansen
Torch songs
UK Singles Chart number-one singles